Rūdolfs Kundrāts (born 1904, date of death unknown) was a Latvian football defender, one of the most reliable in his position in Latvia in 1920s and 1930s.

Kundrāts first gained attention as a good defender when still playing with LNJS Riga in 1926, the following year he moved higher - to LSB Riga, one of the four clubs playing in the newly founded Latvian Higher League. The first two years which Kundrāts spent with LSB were relatively successful for the club as it finished third in the league on both occasions, however in 1929 LSB came out last in Virsliga and after the disappointing season Kundrāts left it for the new Virsliga side - Riga Vanderer.

While playing with Vanderer, Kundrāts became a regular player in the Latvia national football team. Over his seasons with LSB he had been called to the national team several times, yet he had not made an appearance in an international match. Kundrāts made his international début on 27 June 1930 as Latvia drew 1–1 with Estonia in Tallinn. The next year he played 6 matches for Latvia, six more followed in 1932 and six again in 1933. For the last time Kundrāts represented Latvia on 4 September 1933 as it drew 2–2 against Lithuania, securing a victory in the Baltic Cup.

With Riga Vanderer Kundrāts played until 1935 always remaining one of the club's best defenders. In 1932 and 1934 Kundrāts was a member of the team that won silver in the Latvian league, in the same years the side also won the Riga Football Cup. After retiring from active playing Kundrāts was known as one of the best football referees in Latvia.

References

Latvian footballers
Latvia international footballers
1904 births
Year of death missing
Association footballers not categorized by position